The 2012 United States presidential election in California took place on November 6, 2012, as part of the 2012 United States presidential election in which all 50 states plus the District of Columbia participated. California voters chose 55 electors, the most out of any state, to represent them in the Electoral College via a popular vote pitting incumbent Democratic President Barack Obama and his running mate, Vice President Joe Biden, against Republican challenger and former Massachusetts Governor Mitt Romney and his running mate, Congressman Paul Ryan.

Prior to the election, every major news network considered California to be a state Obama would win or as a safe blue state. According to Secretary of State Debra Bowen's website, the President won the popular vote with 60.24 percent, with Mitt Romney in second place at 37.12%, and Libertarian candidate Gary Johnson in third place at 1.10%. The Democrats have won the state in every presidential election after Republican George H. W. Bush won the state in 1988.

As of 2020, this is the most recent presidential election in which the nominee from the Republican Party won Orange County—a longtime, traditional bastion for the national GOP—and Nevada County. This is also the most recent election where California voted more Republican than New York, as of 2020. California voted 5.06% to the right of New York this election. With its 55 electoral votes, California was Obama's largest electoral prize in 2012.

Primaries

Democratic primary 

The 2012 California Democratic presidential primary took place on June 5, 2012, as part of the 2012 Democratic Party presidential primaries.

|-
! Candidate
! Popular vote
! %
! Delegates
|- 
| style="text-align:left;" | Barack Obama (incumbent)
| 2,075,905
| 100%
| 547.0
|-
| style="text-align:left;" | Darcy Richardson (write-in)
| 221
| 0.00%
| 0.0
|-
| style="text-align:left;" | Michael W.R. Meyer, Jr. (write-in)
| 129
| 0.00%
| 0.0
|-
| style="text-align:left;" | Louis Alberto Ramos, Jr. (write-in)
| 54
| 0.00%
| 0.0
|-
| style="text-align:left;"| Uncommitted
| colspan="2" 
| 62.0
|-
! Total
! 2,076,309
! 100%
! 609
|}

Republican primary

The 2012 California Republican Party presidential primary took place on June 5, 2012, as part of the 2012 Republican Party presidential primaries. 169 delegates were chosen, for a total of 172 delegates at the 2012 Republican National Convention.

As noted in the Green Papers for California, "159 district delegates are to be bound to presidential contenders based on the primary results in each of the 53 congressional districts: each congressional district is assigned 3 National Convention delegates and the presidential contender receiving the greatest number of votes in that district will receive all 3 of that district's National Convention delegates.  10 at-large delegates (10 base at-large delegates plus 0 bonus delegate) are to be bound to the presidential contender receiving the greatest number of votes in the primary statewide.  In addition, 3 party leaders, the National Committeeman, the National Committeewoman, and the chairman of the California's Republican Party, will attend the convention as unpledged delegates by virtue of their position."

|-
! Candidate
! Popular vote
! %
! Delegates
|- 
| style="text-align:left;" | Mitt Romney
| 1,530,513
| 79.51%
| 169
|-
| style="text-align:left;" | Ron Paul
| 199,246 
| 10.35%
| 0
|-
| style="text-align:left;" | Rick Santorum (withdrawn)
| 102,258  
| 5.31%
| 0
|-
| style="text-align:left;" | Newt Gingrich (withdrawn)
| 72,022    
| 3.74%
| 0
|-
| style="text-align:left;" | Charles E. "Buddy" Roemer, III (withdrawn)
| 12,520    
| 0.65%
| 0
|-
| style="text-align:left;" | Fred Karger
| 8,393
| 0.44%
| 0
|-
| style="text-align:left;" | Jeremy Hannon (write-in)
| 11
| 0.00%
| 0
|-
| style="text-align:left;" | Donald James Gonzales (write-in)
| 5
| 0.00%
| 0
|-
| style="text-align:left;" | Sheldon Yeu Howard (write-in)
| 2
| 0.00%
| 0
|-
| style="text-align:left;"| Uncommitted
| colspan="2" 
| 3
|-
! Total
! 1,924,970
! 100%
! 172
|}

Green primary

The 2012 California Green Party presidential primary took place on June 5, 2012, as part of the 2012 Green Party presidential primaries.

Libertarian primary

The 2012 California Libertarian Party presidential primary took place on June 5, 2012, as part of the 2012 Libertarian Party presidential primaries.

The primary was non-binding, and took place after Gary Johnson had already won the Libertarian nomination at the Party's 2012 convention.

Other parties

American Independent
The American Independent Party,  a far-right and paleoconservative political party that formed when endorsing the candidacy of George Wallace in 1968 held a small presidential primary on June 5. It was won by Edward C. Noonan. However, the party would instead opt to nominate Tom Hoefling for president.

Peace and Freedom

General election
Candidate Ballot Access:
 Mitt Romney/Paul Ryan, Republican
 Barack Obama/Joseph Biden, Democratic
 Gary Johnson/James P. Gray, Libertarian
 Jill Stein/Cheri Honkala, Green
 Tom Hoefling/Robert Ornelas, Independent
 Roseanne Barr/Cindy Sheehan, Peace and Freedom
Write-In Candidate Access:
 Virgil Goode/Jim Clymer, Constitution
 Rocky Anderson/Luis J. Rodriguez, Justice
 James Harris/Maura DeLuca, Socialist Workers
 Stewart Alexander/Alejandro Mendoza, Socialist
 Jerry White/Phyllis Scherrer, Socialist Equality
 Stephen Durham/Christina Lopez, Freedom Socialist
 Ron Paul/Andrew Napolitano

Results

By county

Counties that flipped from Democratic to Republican 
 Butte (largest city: Chico)
 Nevada (largest town: Truckee)
 Trinity (largest community: Weaverville)

Outcome by city 

Official outcomes by city.

By congressional district
Obama won 41 of the 53 congressional districts, including 3 held by Republicans.

See also
 Timeline of the 2012 United States presidential election
 2012 Republican Party presidential debates and forums
 2012 Republican Party presidential primaries
 Results of the 2012 Republican Party presidential primaries
 California Republican Party

References

External links
The Green Papers: for California
The Green Papers: Major state elections in chronological order

California
U.S. President
2012